Massachusetts House of Representatives' 2nd Bristol district in the United States is one of 160 legislative districts included in the lower house of the Massachusetts General Court. It covers part of Attleboro in Bristol County. Democrat Jim Hawkins of Attleboro has represented the district since 2018.

The current district geographic boundary overlaps with those of the Massachusetts Senate's Bristol and Norfolk and Norfolk, Bristol and Middlesex districts.

Representatives
 John Crane, circa 1858 
 Daniel S. Cobb, circa 1859 
 William Blanding Rogerson, circa 1888 
 Kenneth W. Keith, circa 1920 
 Albert E. Wood, circa 1951 
 Edward Paul Coury, circa 1975 
 Stephen Karol, circa 1994
 John Lepper, 1995–2009
 Bill Bowles, 2009–2011
 George T. Ross, 2011–2013
 Paul Heroux, January 5, 2013 – January 2, 2018
 Jim Hawkins, 2018-current

Former locales
The district previously covered:
 Easton, circa 1927 
 Mansfield, circa 1872 
 Norton, circa 1872

See also
 List of Massachusetts House of Representatives elections
 Other Bristol County districts of the Massachusetts House of Representatives: 1st, 3rd, 4th, 5th, 6th, 7th, 8th, 9th, 10th, 11th, 12th, 13th, 14th
 List of Massachusetts General Courts
 List of former districts of the Massachusetts House of Representatives

Images

References

External links
 Ballotpedia
  (State House district information based on U.S. Census Bureau's American Community Survey).

House
Government of Bristol County, Massachusetts